Sawston Hall Meadows is a  biological Site of Special Scientific Interest in Sawston in Cambridgeshire.

This site has spring fed peat meadows on chalk, a habitat formerly common but now rare. It has the nationally rare flower Selinum carvifolia, which is only found in Cambridgeshire. Drier grassland has a varied flora including spotted-orchid.

The site is private land with no public access.

References

Sites of Special Scientific Interest in Cambridgeshire
Hall Meadows